Tabanus proximus is a species of horse flies in the family Tabanidae.

Subspecies
 Tabanus proximus benedictus Whitney, 1904
 Tabanus proximus proximus Walker, 1848

References

Tabanidae
Insects described in 1848
Taxa named by Francis Walker (entomologist)
Diptera of North America